Billie Jean King defeated the defending champion Evonne Goolagong in the final, 6–3, 6–3 to win the ladies' singles tennis title at the 1972 Wimbledon Championships.

Seeds

  Evonne Goolagong (final)
  Billie Jean King (champion)
  Nancy Richey (quarterfinals)
  Chris Evert (semifinals)
  Kerry Melville (third round)
  Rosie Casals (semifinals)
  Virginia Wade (quarterfinals)
  Françoise Dürr (quarterfinals)

Qualifying

Draw

Finals

Top half

Section 1

Section 2

Section 3

Section 4

Bottom half

Section 5

Section 6

Section 7

Section 8

References

External links

1972 Wimbledon Championships – Women's draws and results at the International Tennis Federation

Women's Singles
Wimbledon Championship by year – Women's singles
Wimbledon Championships
Wimbledon Championships